This list of mills in Tameside, lists textile factories that have existed in Tameside, Greater Manchester, England.

From the Industrial Revolution until the 20th century, the towns of Tameside were a major centres of textile manufacture, particularly cotton spinning. During this period, the valleys of the River Etherow, River Tame and their tributaries were dominated by large rectangular brick-built factories, many of which still remain today as warehouses or converted for residential or retail use.

Mills in Ashton-under-Lyne

Mills in Droylsden

Mills in Dukinfield

Mills in Hyde

Mills in Mossley

Mills in Mottram

Mills in Stalybridge

Others

References

Bibliography

External links

 www.englishmills.co.uk Documenting all the mills in Tameside through pictures and information.

 01
Tameside
Tameside
Buildings and structures in Tameside
History of the textile industry
Industrial Revolution in England